Ian Douglas Freeman Coutts (27 April 1928 – 3 May 1997) was a Scottish sportsman from England who played cricket at first-class level and who represented Scotland in rugby union from 1951 to 1952.

Early life
Ian Coutts was born on 27 April 1928 in Herne Hill, south London and attended Dulwich College. He played both rugby and cricket for the school's first teams. He went up to Lincoln College, Oxford, after a break due to National Service. Coutts was selected for the 1950 Oxford University A side and in 1951 and 1952 won blues for cricket. He also won a rugby blue.

Rugby union career
After university Coutts played his club rugby for Northampton and was also a regular in his schools old boys side, the Old Alleynians. He made his international debut for Scotland whilst still at Oxford, on 13 January 1951 at Colombes against France. Scotland lost this game, and Coutts was also on the losing side when he won his second cap on 15 March 1952, this time against England.

Cricket
Coutts only first-class cricket experience was for Oxford University, as a right arm medium-fast bowler. From 15 matches he took 33 wickets at 35.75. He also later turned out for a number of other sides, including the Harlequins cricket team in 1953, as well as the Free Foresters in the same year. From 1957 to 1959 he played a number of times for the Cryptics and he also turned out for the Old Alleynians cricket side.

References

External links
Cricinfo: Ian Coutts

1928 births
1997 deaths
Scottish rugby union players
Scotland international rugby union players
Rugby union centres
Scottish cricketers
Oxford University cricketers
People educated at Dulwich College
Alumni of Lincoln College, Oxford
Free Foresters cricketers
Northampton Saints players
Oxford University RFC players
Rugby union players from the London Borough of Lambeth